Malyshev (masculine) or Malysheva (feminine) may refer to:
Malyshev Factory, a heavy equipment factory in Ukraine
Vyacheslav Malyshev (1902-1957), Soviet politician buried in the Kremlin Wall Necropolis
Yury Malyshev, several people
Malysheva, several inhabited localities in Russia